Hanwell Town Football Club are a semi-professional football club representing Hanwell, but currently playing in Perivale in the London Borough of Ealing, England. They were the London Spartan League Senior Division champions in 1983 and the Spartan South Midlands League Premier Division champions in 2014. The club is affiliated to the Middlesex County Football Association.

History
The club was formed in 1920 by a group of natives of Newcastle-upon-Tyne who were working in the Hanwell area, who adopted the famous black and white stripes of Newcastle United as their colours.  They played in the London League during the 1920s but dropped down to more local leagues after World War II, where they remained for over twenty years.

In 1970 the club made the step up to the Middlesex County League and by the early 80s were playing in the London Spartan League. In 1983–84 they were Senior Division champions and were promoted to the Premier Division.  During their time in the London Spartan league premier Division the club reached the final of the London Senior Cup three times in a row from the 1991–92 season to the 1993–94 season winning it twice. It was also in this period that the club made their debut in the FA Cup in the 1988–89 season, making it to the Second Qualifying round, losing to Wembley 1–0 at home.

When the league amalgamated with the South Midlands League in 1998, Hanwell were placed in the Premier Division South but after the league's initial transitional season, a reorganisation saw them moved down into the Senior Division. They immediately won promotion back to the Premier Division where they remained until reorganisation of the non-league system in 2006 saw them placed in the new Southern League Division One South and West. In their first season in this division they finished second bottom and were relegated. The club were then jointly managed by former player Keith Rowlands (the club's leading scorer) and Boysie Wise who succeeded Chris Boothe in May 2008. Wise left at the end of the 2009–10 season.  The team was then managed by club leading scorer Keith Rowlands but after sliding into the relegation places by December 2011 Rowlands resigned. He was replaced by Tommy Williams.  The club finished in 21st place but was saved from relegation because no club came down from Step 4 of the football pyramid to the Spartan South Midlands League.

Williams left the club at the end of the season and was succeeded by former manager Ray Duffy, returning for his second spell in charge.  Duffy, with the assistance of his four sons and nephew playing in the team led the club to a sixth-place finish in his first season back. In 2014 they won the Spartan League Premier Division title by 14 points, going the whole season losing just one league game and were promoted back to the Southern League for the first time since 2006–07.  In their first season back at this level, Hanwell finished in 7th place, the highest position the club has been in the football pyramid, while the club were also runners up in the Middlesex Senior Cup having lost 1-0 in the final to Harrow Borough. Ray Duffy and coach Mark Adams stood down at the end of the season being replaced by Phil Granville, assisted by Dave Tilbury who arrived from Harefield United.

In November 2015, despite leading Hanwell Town to the third qualifying round of the FA Cup - the furthest the club have ever been, manager Phil Granville and assistant Dave Tilbury parted company with Hanwell after just six months in charge with the club in 18th place. On 30 November 2015, returning to the side just a few months after leaving was Ray Duffy for a third spell as manager, assisted by Mark Adams. The second half of the season proved difficult leaving the club third from bottom going into the last week of the season, but after two victories Hanwell finished 20th on 39 points.  At the end of the 2017–18 season, as a result of structural changes by the FA to Step 4 of the non-league pyramid, the club was moved laterally to the Isthmian League, South Central Division.

At the end of the 2021–22 season, Hanwell were promoted after beating Chertsey Town 3-2 after extra time to win the Isthmian South Central Division play-off final. It means Hanwell will play Step 3 football for the first time in their history, with the team placed in the 2022–23 Southern Premier Division South.

In May 2022, joint-manager Wayne Carter left Hanwell to take up the manager's position at Isthmian South Central side Chertsey Town - leaving Chris Moore in sole charge.

Ground

Hanwell Town play their home games at The Powerday Stadium in Perivale.

Hanwell moved to the ground (also known as Reynolds Field) in 1981 after over twenty years playing at the Ealing Central Sports Ground.  Floodlights were installed in 1989 and inaugurated with a match against Tottenham Hotspur, since then a stand and disabled facilities have been added.  More recent additions to the ground include the newly built Bob Fisher Stand in honour of the current chairman who has been with the club for sixty years.

Players

Current squad

Backroom staff

Directors
President: Dave Iddiols
Chairman: Bob Fisher
Vice Chairman: Dhali Dhaliwal
CEO: Nigel Hunt
Patron: Steve Pound
Club Secretary: Clive Cooke

Club staff

|}

Honours
Spartan South Midlands League
Premier Division champions 2013–14
London Spartan League
Senior Division champions 1983–84
Middlesex County League
League Cup winners 1969–70
London Senior Cup:
 Winners 1991–92, 1992–93
Middlesex Senior Cup:
 Winners 2020–21

Records
Best league performance: 7th in Southern League Division One Central, 2014–15
Best FA Cup performance: Third qualifying round, 2015–16, 2018–19, 2022–23
Best FA Trophy performance: Second qualifying round, 2006–07, 2016–17
Best FA Vase performance: Fourth round, 2013–14
Record attendance: 600 vs Tottenham Hotspur, friendly, 1989
Most appearances: Phil Player, 617
Most goals: Keith Rowlands

See also
Hanwell Town F.C. players

References

External links
Official website

Sport in the London Borough of Ealing
Football clubs in England
Association football clubs established in 1920
Spartan South Midlands Football League
Southern Football League clubs
Football clubs in London
1920 establishments in England
Isthmian League
Spartan League
London League (football)